Neureclipsis crepuscularis is a species of tube maker caddisflies in the family Polycentropodidae. It is found in North America.

References

Further reading

 Arnett, Ross H. (2000). American Insects: A Handbook of the Insects of America North of Mexico. CRC Press.

External links

 NCBI Taxonomy Browser, Neureclipsis crepuscularis

Trichoptera
Insects described in 1852